Alexandra Park is a public park in the East End of Glasgow, Scotland. Named after Princess Alexandra of Denmark, it opened in 1870. The highest point of the park gives views north to Ben Lomond and south to the Tinto Hills. The park is generally open from dawn to dusk daily, but the facilities inside the park have separate opening and closing times accordingly.

History

 1866: The City Improvement Trustees of Glasgow purchased the land of Alexandra Park from Mr Walter Stewart with the intention of giving the people of the north-east of Glasgow a place of leisure and recreation. When the land was purchased it was bare and barren with hardly any trees.  Ordnance Survey maps of this time show the land named as Tollcross Park.
 1867–1868: Hundreds of unemployed artisans and labourers were employed to begin the renovation of the park to give them something to do during the great trade depression.
 1870: The park is officially opened and named after Princess Alexandra of Denmark who was the wife of the future King Edward VII.

Location
The park is located in the Dennistoun area (bordering Haghill) about two miles from Glasgow's  city centre, It sits neatly between the M8 motorway to the north, Alexandra Parade/Cumbernauld Road (A8/A80) to the south, Provan Road (Riddrie) to the east and Sannox Gardens (Milnbank) to the west. Its most identifiable features are the two large pedestrian gates that can be seen from Alexandra Parade/Cumbernauld Road.

Features
One of the notable features of Alexandra Park is the  cast-iron Walter MacFarlane-built , which was gifted to the city of Glasgow after the 1901 International Exhibition and remained in Kelvingrove Park for 12 years after the exhibition. In 1914, Glasgow Corporation took the decision to re-site the fountain to its present location. In 2000, the fountain was restored at a cost of £22,000.

Alexandra Park Golf Club is a nine-hole golf course situated inside the park.

See also
 Glasgow Golf Club

References

External links
 Alexandra Park – Glasgow City Council

Parks and commons in Glasgow